The Spadolini I Cabinet, led by Giovanni Spadolini, was the 39th cabinet of the Italian Republic.

The government, in office from 28 June 1981 to 23 August 1982, was led by for the first time in the republican history of Italy by a non-Christian Democrat Prime Minister, the Republican Spadolini. However, Christian Democracy (DC) maintained the majority of ministries, while forming a large coalition of five parties (Pentapartito) with Italian Socialist Party (PSI), Italian Democratic Socialist Party (PSDI), Italian Republican Party (PRI) and Italian Liberal Party (PLI).

The cabinet fell after the reject of the government's budget law. After that, Spadolini resigned on 7 August 1982.

Party breakdown

Ministers and other members
 Italian Republican Party (PRI): prime minister, 1 minister, 3 undersecretaries
 Christian Democracy (DC): 15 ministers, 31 undersecretaries
 Italian Socialist Party (PSI): 7 ministers, 15 undersecretaries
 Italian Democratic Socialist Party (PSDI): 3 ministers, 5 undersecretaries
 Italian Liberal Party (PLI): 1 minister, 3 undersecretaries

Composition

References

Italian governments
Cabinets established in 1981
Cabinets disestablished in 1982
1981 establishments in Italy
1982 disestablishments in Italy